The 1950 Bavarian state election was held on 26 November 1950 to elect the members of the 2nd Landtag of Bavaria. It is notable for featuring the worst performance of the Christian Social Union in Bavaria in any Bavarian state election, at only 27.4% of the vote, and for being the only Bavarian election in which the SPD won a plurality of the combined vote.

Background
After the 1946 state elections, the CSU had won a majority of seats in the Landtag, and proceeded to form a coalition government with the SPD and right-wing populist WAV under Minister-President Hans Ehard. The coalition, however, was short lived. On 20 June 1947, WAV party chairman and Minister for Denazification Alfred Loritz was ousted by his fellow party-members over a power struggle involving a fellow state delegate, Karl Meissner. Four days later, on 24 June, Loritz was dismissed  from his post on charges of blackmail and patronage. He subsequently was arrested on 19 July 1947, before escaping custody, being re-arrested, and eventually found asylum in Switzerland in April 1948. In his place, a CSU attorney, Ludwig Hagenauer was appointed. Only three months after the Loritz episode, all of the SPD ministers within the government resigned, ending the coalition government, which lasted for under a year. The CSU then ruled alone (still as a majority government) for the remaining three years. In the intervening time, Ehard mainly battled with other member of his party to pass the Basic Law.
The electoral system was changed since the 1946 election, now every voter has two votes. One for local district candidate (first vote) and one for a constituency candidate (second vote).

Parties
The table below lists parties represented in the First Landtag of Bavaria.

Results
With the WAV now essentially collapsed due to factional disputes, the right-wing vote was scattered over several different parties, the most important being the GB/BHE and the Bavaria Party, which capitalized on nationalism and took votes away from both the WAV and CSU. With the right-wing vote now spread thin, the SPD captured a majority of the first and second votes combined, but were still one seat off of being tied with the CSU's delegation, and neither party being close to a majority. After 17 days of negotiations, a mass coalition between the CSU, SPD, and GB/BHE was declared. On 18 December 1950, Hans Ehard received 131 votes in the Landtag to serve a second term as Minister-President, with 5 votes against, and 36 members abstaining.

|-
! colspan="2" | Party
! Votes
! %
! +/-
! Seats 
! +/-
! Seats %
|-
| bgcolor=| 
| align=left | Christian Social Union (CSU)
| align=right| 2,527,370	
| align=right| 27.4
| align=right|  24.9
| align=right| 64
| align=right|  40
| align=right| 31.4
|-
| bgcolor=| 
| align=left | Social Democratic Party (SPD)
| align=right| 2,588,549	
| align=right| 28.0
| align=right|  0.6
| align=right| 63
| align=right|  9
| align=right| 30.8
|-
| bgcolor= | 
| align=left | Bavaria Party
| align=right| 1,657,713
| align=right| 17.9
| align=right|  17.9
| align=right| 39
| align=right|  39
| align=right| 19.1
|-
| bgcolor=| 
| align=left | All-German Bloc/League of Expellees and Deprived of Rights (GB/BHE)
| align=right| 1,136,148
| align=right| 12.3
| align=right|  12.3
| align=right| 26
| align=right|  26
| align=right| 7.8
|-
| bgcolor=| 
| align=left | Free Democratic Party (FDP)
| align=right| 653,741
| align=right| 7.1
| align=right|  1.4
| align=right| 12
| align=right|  3
| align=right| 5.9
|-
! colspan=8|
|-
| bgcolor= | 
| align=left | Economic Reconstruction Union (WAV)
| align=right| 259,687	
| align=right| 2.8
| align=right|  4.6
| align=right| 0
| align=right|  13
| align=right| 0
|-
| bgcolor=| 
| align=left | Communist Party (KPD)
| align=right| 177,768
| align=right| 1.9
| align=right|  4.2
| align=right| 0
| align=right| ±0
| align=right| 0
|-
|
| align=left | Others
| align=right| 240,184
| align=right| 2.6
| align=right| 
| align=right| 0
| align=right| ±0
| align=right| 0
|-
! align=right colspan=2| Total
! align=right| 9,621,691
! align=right| 100.0
! align=right| 
! align=right| 204
! align=right| +24
! align=right|  
|-
! align=right colspan=2| Voter turnout
! align=right| 
! align=right| 79.9
! align=right|  9.3
! align=right| 
! align=right| 
! align=right|
|-
|colspan=8 align=left|Source: Statistik Bayern and Historisches Lexikon Bayerns 
|}

References

External links
 Historisches Lexikon Bayerns
 House of Bavarian Elections 

Bavaria